is a Japanese footballer currently playing as a left winger or a left back for Hokkaido Consadole Sapporo.

Personal life
Tanaka is the brother of fellow footballer Wataru Tanaka.

Career statistics

Club
.

Notes

References

External links

1999 births
Living people
Association football people from Gunma Prefecture
Rissho University alumni
Japanese footballers
Association football midfielders
Hokkaido Consadole Sapporo players